Pro-opiomelanocortin converting enzyme (prohormone converting enzyme, pro-opiomelanocortin-converting enzyme, proopiomelanocortin proteinase, PCE) is an enzyme. This enzyme catalyses the following chemical reaction

 Cleavage at paired basic residues in certain prohormones, either between them, or on the carboxyl side

This membrane-bound enzyme is isolated from cattle pituitary secretory vesicle.

References

External links 
 

EC 3.4.23